Dave Schrage is an American baseball coach and former outfielder. He played college baseball at Creighton University for head coach Dave Underwood from 1980 to 1983. He then served as the head coach of the Waldorf Warriors (1988–1990), Northern Iowa Panthers (1991–1999), Northern Illinois Huskies (2000–2002), Evansville Purple Aces (2003–2006), Notre Dame Fighting Irish (2007–2010) South Dakota State Jackrabbits (2012–2016) and the Butler Bulldogs (2017–2022).

Playing career
Schrage played four seasons as an outfielder at Creighton from 1980 to 1983, earning all-conference and Academic All-American honors.  He hit .400 or higher in both his junior and senior seasons.

Coaching career
After completing his degree at Creighton, Schrage accepted a position as a graduate assistant at St. Thomas, working for Paul Mainieri in 1984.  The following season, he returned to Creighton as an assistant coach before coaching the Queensland Rams club team in Australia.  He earned his first head coaching job at Waldorf, then a junior college in 1987.  After three seasons and a 61–66 record, Schrage moved to Northern Iowa.  He would remain with the Panthers for nine seasons, improving the team's win totals from 2 to 18 during his tenure and earning a pair of Missouri Valley Conference Coach of the Year awards.  He would be honored as the only person to be named All-Conference and Coach of the Year in baseball by the MVC at their Centennial Celebration.  From 2000 to 2002, Schrage served as head coach at Northern Illinois.  He took over a team that recorded only 4 wins the previous season and guided them to 24 wins in his first year and a winning season in his second.  He was named runner-up for the National Coach of the Year Award by Collegiate Baseball.  Schrage then moved to Evansville, where he led the Purple Aces to 130 wins and a regional final in the 2006 NCAA Tournament.  Schrage then earned what he called his dream job, succeeding Mainieri as head coach at Notre Dame.  Prior to coaching a game, his wife Jody died from cancer.  Schrage was not able to continue Mainieri's success with the Irish, and was fired after four years.  He was hired to coach the Jackrabbits in the summer of 2011. After coaching the Jackrabbits to a 136–144–1 record over the past 5 seasons, on July 5, 2016 he was hired to be the head coach of Butler University within the Big East conference. Retired from coaching on 5/21/22

Head coaching record
Below is a table of Schrage's yearly records as a head baseball coach.

Personal
Schrage's wife Jody passed away on January 9, 2007. They had two daughters, Kaitlyn and Brianne.

References

Living people
Butler Bulldogs baseball coaches
Creighton Bluejays baseball coaches
Creighton Bluejays baseball players
Evansville Purple Aces baseball coaches
Northern Illinois Huskies baseball coaches
Northern Iowa Panthers baseball coaches
Notre Dame Fighting Irish baseball coaches
South Dakota State Jackrabbits baseball coaches
St. Thomas Bobcats baseball coaches
Waldorf Warriors baseball coaches
Year of birth missing (living people)
Baseball coaches from Illinois
American expatriate baseball people in Australia
Sportspeople from Chicago